Morton-on-Swale is a large village and civil parish in the Hambleton district of North Yorkshire, England. It lies on the A684 road about 4 miles west of the County Town of Northallerton. As the name suggests it lies on the River Swale.

History

The village is mentioned twice in the Domesday Book as Moretun. At the time of the Norman invasion, the lands were part of the manor of Kirkby Fleetham held by Gospatric, son of Arnketil, with some lands held by Grim. Afterwards the descent of the manor followed that of nearby Ainderby Steeple.

The toponymy of the village is derived from the Old English word mōr for Moor and the word tun for farm, with the addition of the geographical reference to the nearby river, giving Moor farm on the River Swale.

Governance

The village lies within the Richmond UK Parliament constituency. It also lies within the Swale electoral division of North Yorkshire County Council and the Morton-on-Swale ward of Hambleton District Council. An electoral ward in the same name exists. This ward stretches north to Danby Wiske with a total population taken at the 2011 Census of 1,761.

Geography

The parish boundary is formed by the River Swale on the west and River Wiske on the east and south. The northern boundary runs just south of Thrintoft. The neighbouring parishes consist of Ainderby Steeple, Thrintoft, Scruton, Leeming, Gatenby, Maunby, Newby Wiske and Warlaby. The village lies on the A684 road between Northallerton and Bedale. The villages of Ainderby Steeple and Thrintoft are within a mile of the village.

In September 2000, the Environment Agency installed a river level monitoring station in the village. It measures the water levels in the River Swale.

The Wensleydale Railway Association have extended their line, that currently runs from Redmire to Leeming Bar, to run just to the north of the village. This section open to traffic between 2014 and 2016, with a temporary station at Northallerton West and plans to go as far as the East Coast Main Line. This has meant the construction of two level crossings in the village.

Demography

2001 census

The 2001 UK census showed that the population was split 48.6% male to 51.4% female. The religious constituency was made of 86.4% Christian and the rest stating no religion or not stating at all. The ethnic make-up was 98.1% White British, 1.13% White other and 0.75% Mixed Asian. There were 242 dwellings.

2011 census

The 2011 UK census showed that the population was split 46.6% male to 53.4% female. The religious constituency was made of 71.3% Christian, 0.4% Buddhist and the rest stating no religion or not stating at all. The ethnic make-up was 95.5% White British with the rest consisting of 4.3% each White Other and 0.2% Asian British. There were 250 dwellings.

Community and culture

There is no church in the village, though the Methodists did erect a chapel in 1815 which is now a Grade II listed private dwelling. The United Methodist Free Church also built a chapel in 1879, which is also private dwellings. The village is served by three bus routes running from Northallerton to RAF Leeming, Bedale and Hawes. There is one public house, a butchers shop and a village store that includes the local post office.

Education

Notwithstanding its name, Ainderby Steeple Church of England Primary School is situated on Station Lane, Morton-on-Swale which is within the catchment area of Northallerton School, which provides secondary education and sixth form facilities. Also located in the village near the Primary School is The Dales School, which is a special co-educational school for those with severe and complex learning requirements. It provides some post 16 years old education.

References

External links

Villages in North Yorkshire
Civil parishes in North Yorkshire